El Club de Los Tigritos is a Spanish-language children's variety program originating in Venezuela on the Venevision television network beginning in 1994, and syndicated to other stations and networks around the world. In 2000, the show became Rugemania. The show was notable for featuring almost entirely children and teenagers as performers and hosts, and it consisted of various segments of singing, dancing, and acting. The dance group was known as the Ballet de Marjorie Flores after its teacher and choreographer.

External links 
 

1990s Venezuelan television series
1994 Venezuelan television series debuts
Venevisión original programming
Venezuelan children's television series